Pedro Henrique may refer to:

Politicians
 Prince Pedro Henrique of Orléans-Braganza (1909–1981), great-grandson of the last emperor of Brazil

Sportspeople
 Pedro Henrique (footballer, born October 1985), Brazilian football goalkeeper
 Pedro Henrique (footballer, born November 1985), Brazilian football striker
 Pedro Henrique (footballer, born 1990), Brazilian football winger for Kayserispor
 Pedro Henrique Oliveira (born 1992), East Timorese football forward for Sri Pahang FC
 Pedro Henrique (footballer, born December 1992), Brazilian football centre-back for Vitória SC
 Pedro Henrique (footballer, born September 1992), Brazilian football centre-back for Khon Kaen FC
 Pedro Henrique (footballer, born 1995), Brazilian football defender for Athletico Paranaense.
 Pedro Henrique (footballer, born 1996), Brazilian football forward for Farense
 Pedro Henrique (footballer, born 2001), Brazilian football defender for Internacional

See also